The following is a list of episodes from the Netflix adult animated series F Is for Family. During the course of the series, 44 episodes of F Is for Family were released over five seasons.

Series overview

Episodes

Season 1 (2015)

Season 2 (2017)

Season 3 (2018)

Season 4 (2020)

Season 5 (2021)

References

External links

Lists of American adult animated television series episodes
Lists of American comedy-drama television series episodes
Lists of American sitcom episodes